vivaHiba was a citizen journalism website. It enabled freelance photojournalists and amateurs to share their user-generated content and photojournalism in Turkish language.

The website was launched in November 2013 by co-founders Hidir Gevis and Baris Sarer and is based in New York, US and Istanbul, Turkey. The objective of vivaHiba was to "create a hybrid citizen/professional journalism" without editorial control by connecting independent journalists and citizens with the traditional media.

References

External links 
 

Turkish news websites
Citizen journalism